Melim is a Brazilian trio of siblings consisting of Rodrigo, Gabriela, and Diogo Melim. In 2016, they took part  in the musical reality show  Superstar on TV Globo, reaching the semi-finals, not advancing to the finals. In 2018, they signed a recording contract with Universal Music and released their first EP called Melim.

In 2021, their song "Amores e Flores" was nominated for the Latin Grammy Award for Best Portuguese Language Song.

Discography

Studio albums  
 Melim (2018) 
 Eu feat. você (2020)

References 

Universal Music Group artists
Musical trios
Música popular brasileira musical groups
Brazilian pop music groups
Brazilian reggae musical groups
Musical groups from Rio de Janeiro (city)
Musical groups established in 2015
2015 establishments in Brazil